Charles Henry Davis ( – ) was an American scientist and rear admiral of the United States Navy. While working for the U.S. Coast Survey, he researched tides and currents, and located an uncharted shoal that had caused wrecks off of the coast of New York. During the American Civil War, he commanded the Western Gunboat Flotilla, where he won an important engagement in the First Battle of Memphis before capturing enemy supplies on a successful expedition up the Yazoo River. Davis was also one of the founders of the National Academy of Sciences in 1863 and he wrote several scientific books.

Early life 
Davis was born in Boston, Massachusetts. He attended the Boston Latin School and entered Harvard College in 1821, but left after two years when he was appointed as a midshipman in the United States Navy on August 12, 1823.

Between 1827 and 1828, he served on board the frigate  in the Pacific. In 1829, he was promoted to passed midshipman. From 1830 to 1833, he served on the sloop . In 1840 to 1841, he served on board the ship .

In 1841, he received an honorary Bachelor of Arts degree from Harvard; in 1868, he received an honorary LL.D. from the same institution.

Career
During his service to the Survey, he was also responsible for researching tides and currents and acted as an inspector on a number of naval shipyards. From 1849 to 1855 he was the first superintendent of American Nautical Almanac Office and produced the American Ephemeris and Nautical Almanac.

On April 30, 1857, he mediated with the Central American forces at San Juan del Sur, Nicaragua, the capitulation of filibuster William Walker and some 300 men, who departed in the St. Mary's for Panama the next day. In 1859, while commanding the St. Mary's, Davis was ordered to go to Baker Island to obtain samples of guano, becoming perhaps the first American to set foot there since it was annexed by the United States in 1857. The guano was necessary as fertilizer. Commodore William Mervine had previously been sent, but he did not land and believed the island to be inaccessible. (From evidence that was later found on the island, it had been visited prior to 1857 by whalers).

Civil War service
In the American Civil War, Davis was appointed to Blockade Strategy Board in June 1861. On 15 November 1861, he was promoted to captain. He was made acting flag officer, in command of the Western Gunboat Flotilla. A day after he took command, the flotilla fought a short battle with Confederate ships on the Mississippi River at Plum Point Bend on May 10, 1862. Caught unready for battle, two of the Union ships were badly damaged and had to be run into shoal water to keep from sinking. The Confederate vessels escaped with only minor damage. On June 6, his ships fought in the Battle of Memphis, which resulted in the sinking or capture of seven of the eight Confederate ships, compared with damage to only one of the Union vessels. In July, he cooperated with Flag Officer David G. Farragut in an attack on Vicksburg, Mississippi, but they were forced to withdraw. In August, he proceeded up the Yazoo River and successfully seized Confederate supplies and munitions there. After this excursion, he was made Chief of the Bureau of Navigation and returned to Washington, D.C..

On February 7, 1863, he was promoted to rear admiral.

Post-war service

After the war he joined the Military Order of the Loyal Legion of the United States (MOLLUS).  He was a member of the New York Commandery and received insignia number 1022.

Published 1857, Davis translated to English a copy of Carl Friedrich Gauss' Theory of the Motion of the Heavenly Bodies Moving about the Sun in Conic Sections.

From 1865 to 1867, he was the Superintendent of the United States Naval Observatory. In 1869, he returned home and served both on the Lighthouse Board as well as in the Naval Observatory. Davis died in Washington, D.C., and is buried in Cambridge, Massachusetts.

Personal life
He married Harriette Blake Mills, the daughter of U.S. Senator Elijah Hunt Mills. Together, they were the parents of:

 Constant Davis, an 1864 graduate of Harvard who died of tuberculosis in 1869.
 Anna Cabot Mills Davis, who married U.S. Senator Henry Cabot Lodge. 
 Evelyn Davis, who married Brooks Adams, son of Charles Francis Adams Sr., grandson of President John Quincy Adams, and great-grandson of President John Adams. Brooks and Evelyn were the last of the Adams families to live at Peacefield, which was home to three previous generations of Adamses.
 Charles Henry Davis, Jr., a Commander of the U.S. Navy served as Chief Intelligence Officer of the Office of Naval Intelligence from September 1889 to August 1892.

In 1843, he became a member of the Massachusetts Society of the Cincinnati in succession to his grandfather Colonel Constant Freeman (1757–1824). Davis was elected as a member of the American Philosophical Society in 1852.

Davis died in Washington, D.C. on February 18, 1877.

Namesake

A species of sea anemone native to the coasts of New England and Nova Scotia, the Rhodactis davisii, is named for Davis.

See also

 Seth Ledyard Phelps (Lieutenant-Commander who served under Davis)
 Bibliography of the American Civil War
 List of United States Navy four-star admirals

References
Notes

Bibliography
 Eicher, John H., and Eicher, David J., Civil War High Commands, Stanford University Press, 2001, .
"Navy." The Military and Naval Magazine of the United States. Washington: Mar 1835. Vol.5, Iss. 1;  pg. 78, 3 pgs
"The Independence." The Naval Magazine. New York: May 1837. Vol.2, Iss. 3;  pg. 290, 2 pgs
"American Guano." The New England Farmer; a Monthly Journal. Boston: Jun 1859. Vol.11, Iss. 6;  pg. 265, 2 pgs
"The American Guano Islands." National Era. Washington: Jun 16, 1859. Vol.VOL. XIII., Iss. No. 650.;  pg. 94, 1 pgs
"The Aquarial Gardens." Friends' Intelligencer. Philadelphia: Aug 6, 1859. Vol.16, Iss. 21;  pg. 333, 3 pgs
"Another Naval Victory." New York Times. New York, N.Y.: May 12, 1862. pg. 8, 1 pgs
"Current Events." The New-England Historical and Genealogical Register. Boston: 1862. pg. 299, 3 pgs
"Rear Admiral Charles H. Davis." New York Times. New York, N.Y.: Feb 19, 1877. pg. 5, 1 pgs

External links
 Memoir of Charles Henry Davis (1807–1877)
 

1807 births
1877 deaths
United States Navy rear admirals (upper half)
Union Navy admirals
People of Massachusetts in the American Civil War
People from Boston
Members of the American Philosophical Society
 Harvard College alumni
 Boston Latin School alumni